Mireia Lalaguna Royo (born 21 November 1992) is a Spanish model, actress and beauty queen who was crowned Miss World 2015. She was previously crowned Miss World Spain 2015, becoming the first woman from Spain to win Miss World.

Early life and education
Lalaguna was born in Barcelona on 21 November 1992. She obtained her bachelor's degree in pharmacy at the University of Barcelona in Spain. Lalaguna is fluent in Catalan, Spanish, French, and English.

Pageantry
Lalaguna ventured into pageantry in 2014. She represented Spain at the Miss Atlántico Internacional 2014 pageant, where she was eventually declared as the winner, crowned by outgoing titleholder Lorena Romaso.

Miss World Spain

Lalaguna competed at the third edition of Miss World Spain on 24 October 2015 in Málaga, representing Barcelona. At the end of the event, she was crowned as Miss World Spain 2015 by her predecessor Lourdes Rodríguez of Castilla-La Mancha. She also won the Miss Luxury special award at the event.

Miss World 2015
Lalaguna represented Spain at Miss World 2015 pageant on 19 December 2015, held in Sanya, China. After advancing to the top five, she answered the question "Why do you think you should win Miss World 2015?" with the following response:

By the end of the event, Lalaguna was crowned Miss World 2015 by outgoing titleholder Rolene Strauss. This was the first time Spain won the Miss World competition. title since the pageant's inception in 1951. This was only the second major international pageant Spain had won, the other being when Amparo Muñoz won Miss Universe 1974.

During her reign, she  traveled to Indonesia, Puerto Rico, the United States, India, Kenya, Russia, China, Philippines, Korea, England, South Africa, Ghana, Mexico, Brazil, Italy, Jersey and Spain.

References

External links
 

1992 births
Living people
Miss Spain winners
Miss World 2015 delegates
Miss World winners
People from Barcelona
Spanish beauty pageant winners
Spanish female models
University of Copenhagen alumni